Aníbal González may refer to:

Aníbal González (footballer, born 1964), Chilean football forward
Aníbal González (footballer, born 1995), Mexican football forward, and son of footballer born 1964